The Peretz Centre for Secular Jewish Culture is a centre for secular Jewish culture and humanistic Judaism in Vancouver, British Columbia.

The stated purpose of the Peretz Centre is to "provide a quality alternative approach to Jewish life through the appreciation of Jewish history and culture in the context of world history, and the celebration of secular (non-religious) and humanist Jewish traditions."

The Peretz Centre is affiliated with the International Federation of Secular Humanistic Jews, Cultural and Secular Jewish Organizations, and the Jewish Federation of Greater Vancouver.

With roots including the Jewish Bund, the Peretz remains committed to social justice and diversity. Though as a cultural organization it doesn't take a position on Israeli, Canadian or world politics, it is associated with Vancouver's Jewish left community.

History

The Vancouver Peretz Institute, also known as the Vancouver Peretz Shule, was founded in 1945 at 13th Avenue and Birch Street in response to the threat to Jewish culture and Yiddish language posed by the Holocaust and World War II. The Centre was named after Isaac Leib Peretz, who, along with Sholem Aleichem and Mendele Mochim Sforim, is one of the "fathers of Yiddish literature and culture."

In 1959–1960 it had 118 children, but by 1971 its enrolment had dropped to below 50.

In 2001, a new building was constructed at the same location, and the name was changed to the "Peretz Centre for Secular Jewish Culture".

Programs
The Peretz Centre runs a two-year bnei mitzvah program, a coming-of-age ceremony for boys and girls, that focuses on developing a connection to Jewish heritage through learning about Jewish history and culture.

The Centre also hosts the Vancouver Jewish Folk Choir, which performs Jewish songs in Yiddish, Hebrew, Ladino, and English.

In addition, the Peretz Centre has Yiddish classes, Sholem Aleichem Speakers Series (SASS), Exploring Jewish Writers (EJW), and regularly hosts secular humanist versions of Jewish holidays.

It is also home to the Jewish Museum & Archives of British Columbia, Ahavat Olam Synagogue, Jewish Food Bank storage and distribution,  MOST/Bridge Russian Seniors, and the Vancouver Jewish Film Festival.

Pandemic 
During the current restrictions due to the coronavirus pandemic, all Peretz programs and shabbes/holiday observances have moved online.

References

External links
 Official website
 

Humanistic Judaism
Jews and Judaism in Vancouver
Secular Jewish culture in Canada
Education in Vancouver
Buildings and structures in Vancouver
Community centres in Canada
Culture of Vancouver
Educational institutions established in 1945
1945 establishments in British Columbia